Mealista was a township in the west of the Isle of Lewis. It is currently largely uninhabited due to the Highland Clearances, which occurred there in 1838. The beach is a visitor attraction.

History 
Mealista is a name of Norse origin, melr-stadhr, meaning 'lyme-grass steading'. Mealasta lends its name to Eilean Mhealasta which is just to the southwest. The area of Mealasta is known to be the location of a medieval settlement

Tigh nan Cailleachan Dubha, the House of the Black Women, is one of the medieval ruins, which is purported to have been a nunnery, but that is doubted.

During World War II, fourteen of the survivors of the merchant ship SS Geraldine Mary reached shore at Mealista in August 1940. The ship had been torpedoed, off the coast of Ireland, by the German U-Boat U-52.

During WWII several hundred people were stationed at Mealista and Brenais, to operate wireless and radar installations. There was a cinema, a bar, regular dances, but the area was again abandoned after the war.

Teampall Mhealastadh 
Outside of Mealista is Teampall Mhealastadh, the remains of small chapel and graveyard. Most of the tombstones are now buried.

References

External links

Canmore - Mazeppa: Mealasta, Lewis, Atlantic site record

Villages in the Isle of Lewis
Cleared places in the Outer Hebrides